The Bisayan languages or Visayan  languages are a subgroup of the Austronesian languages spoken in the Philippines. They are most closely related to Tagalog and the Bikol languages, all of which are part of the Central Philippine languages. Most Bisayan languages are spoken in the whole Visayas section of the country, but they are also spoken in the southern part of the Bicol Region (particularly in Masbate and Sorsogon where several dialects of Waray are spoken), islands south of Luzon, such as those that make up Romblon, most of the areas of Mindanao and the province of Sulu located southwest of Mindanao. Some residents of Metro Manila also speak one of the Bisayan languages.

Over 30 languages constitute the Bisayan language family. The Bisayan language with the most speakers is Cebuano, spoken by 20 million people as a native language in Central Visayas, parts of Eastern Visayas, and most of Mindanao. Two other well-known and widespread Bisayan languages are Hiligaynon (Ilonggo), spoken by 9 million in most of Western Visayas and Soccsksargen; and Waray-Waray, spoken by 6 million in Eastern Visayas region. Prior to colonization, the script and calligraphy of most of the Visayan peoples was the badlit, closely related to the Tagalog baybayin.

Nomenclature
Native speakers of most Bisayan languages, especially Cebuano, Hiligaynon and Waray, not only refer to their language by their local name, but also by Bisaya or Binisaya, meaning Bisayan language. This is misleading or may lead to confusion as different languages may be called Bisaya by their respective speakers despite their languages being mutually unintelligible. However, languages that are classified within the Bisayan language family but spoken natively in places outside of the Visayas do not use the self-reference Bisaya or Binisaya. To speakers of Cuyonon, Surigaonon, Butuanon and Tausug, the term Visayan usually refers to either Cebuano or Hiligaynon.

There have been no proven accounts to verify the origins of Bisaya. However, there is an ethnic group in Malaysia and Brunei who call themselves with the same name. However, these ethnic groups in the Philippines must not be confused with those in Borneo.

Evidence 
David Zorc lists the following innovations as features defining the Bisayan languages as a group (Zorc 1977:241). Tausug is noted to have diverged early from the group and may have avoided some sound changes that affected the others.

 *lC, *Cl > *Cl (where C is any consonant not *h, *q, or *l)
 *qC, *Cq > *Cq (MOST)  *qC, *Cq > *qC (Tausug, and most Bikol languages)

Internal classification 
David Zorc gives the following internal classification for the Bisayan languages (Zorc 1977:32). The five primary branches are South, Cebuan, Central, Banton, and West. However, Zorc notes that the Bisayan language family is more like a dialect continuum rather than a set of readily distinguishable languages. The South Bisayan languages are considered to have diverged first, followed by Cebuan and then the rest of the three branches. Also, in the Visayas section, the province of Romblon has the most linguistic diversity, as languages from three primary Bisayan branches are spoken there: Romblomanon from Central Bisayan, Inunhan from Western Bisayan and Banton (which has an independent Bisayan branch).

Notably, Baybayanon and Porohanon have Warayan substrata, indicating a more widespread distribution of Waray before Cebuano speakers started to expand considerably starting from the mid-1800s.

A total of 36 varieties are listed below. Individual languages are marked by italics.

 Bisayan
 1. South (spoken on the northeastern coast of Mindanao)
 Butuan-Tausug
 Tausug
 Butuanon
 Surigao
 Surigaonon
 Tandaganon
 2. Cebuan (spoken in Cebu, Bohol, Siquijor, Eastern Negros, western Leyte and northern, southeastern and northwestern parts of Mindanao)
 Cebuan
 Cebuano
 Boholano
 3. Central (spoken across most of the Visayan region)
 Warayan (spoken in eastern Leyte, Biliran and Samar)
 Waray
 Baybayanon
 Kabalian
 Southern Sorsogon (Gubat)
  Peripheral
 Hiligaynon (Ilonggo) (spoken in eastern Panay and Guimaras, Western Negros and south-central Mindanao)
 Capiznon
 Bantayanon
 Porohanon
 Masbate-Sorsogon
 Masbateño
 Central Sorsogon (Masbate)
 Romblon (also the name of the province)
 Romblomanon
 4. Asi (spoken in northwestern Romblon Province)
 Asi
 5. West
 Aklan (spoken in northwestern Panay)
 Aklanon/Inakeanon
 Malaynon
 Karayan
 Karay-a (spoken in western and inland Panay)
 North-Central (spoken on Tablas Island and the southern tip of Mindoro)
 Inonhan (language related to Karayan)
 Kuyan (spoken in the archipelagos west of Panay and Romblon as well as the southern tip of Mindoro)
 Ratagnon
 Cuyonon
 Caluyanon
 Caluyanon

The auxiliary language of Eskayan is grammatically Bisayan, but has essentially no Bisayan (or Philippine) vocabulary.

Magahat and Karolanos, both spoken in Negros, are unclassified within Bisayan.

Ethnologue classification
Ethnologue classifies the 25 Bisayan languages into five subgroups:

Names and locations
Zorc (1977: 14–15) lists the following names and locations of Bisayan languages. The recently documented languages Karolanos, Magahat, and Kabalian are not listed in Zorc (1977).

Comparisons 
The following comparisons are from data gathered by Zorc (1997).

Personal-noun case markers

Common-name case markers

Reconstruction

David Zorc's reconstruction of Proto-Bisayan had 15 consonants and 4 vowels (Zorc 1977:201). Vowel length, primary stress (penultimate and ultimate), and secondary stress (pre-penultimate) are also reconstructed by Zorc.

See also
 Bisalog
 Bislish
 Bisakol languages
 Classical Cebuano
 Visayans

References

External links 

 "Bisayan" on Ethnologue, (23rd ed., 2020).

 
Central Philippine languages